Eduardo Gonzaga Mendes Santos (born 28 November 1997) is a Brazilian professional footballer who plays as a centre-back for Slavia Prague.

Career
Santos began his career at the age of 13, signing for Fluminense, after initially playing street football. After a short spell at Juventus da Mooca, Santos rejoined Fluminense for a fee of R$415,310 in 2017. At Fluminense, Santos was loaned out in 2018 to Portuguese LigaPro sides Real, where he made 16 league appearances, and Famalicão, where he made one league appearance. In 2019, Santos was loaned to Brazilian Série B club São Bento, making four league appearances during his time at the club.

In 2020, Santos left Fluminense to join Capivariano, before joining Czech club Karviná on loan alongside fellow Capivariano player Jean Mangabeira. After nine league appearances for Karviná in the 2019–20 Czech First League season, Santos made his move to the club permanent ahead of the following season. On 21 February 2022, after 57 appearances and three goals in all competitions for Karviná, Viktoria Plzeň announced the signing of Santos on a six-month loan. Santos made ten appearances as Viktoria Plzeň won the Czech First League for the first time since 2018. On 11 June 2022, Slavia Prague announced the signing of Santos on a four-year contract.

References

Living people
1997 births
Association football defenders
Footballers from São Paulo
Brazilian footballers
Fluminense FC players
Real S.C. players
F.C. Famalicão players
Esporte Clube São Bento players
Capivariano Futebol Clube players
MFK Karviná players
FC Viktoria Plzeň players
SK Slavia Prague players
Liga Portugal 2 players
Campeonato Brasileiro Série B players
Czech First League players
Brazilian expatriate footballers
Brazilian expatriate sportspeople in Portugal
Expatriate footballers in Portugal
Brazilian expatriate sportspeople in the Czech Republic
Expatriate footballers in the Czech Republic
Czech National Football League players